Malachi Throne (December 1, 1928 – March 13, 2013) was an American actor, noted for his guest-starring roles on Star Trek, Star Trek: The Next Generation, Voyage to the Bottom of the Sea, Lost in Space, Batman, Land of the Giants, The Time Tunnel, Mission: Impossible, and The Six Million Dollar Man, and best known as Noah Bain on It Takes a Thief.

Early life
Throne was born in New York City to Austro-Hungarian and Russian Jews, Samuel and Rebecca Throne, who emigrated to America before World War II. His mother Rebecca's parents were Max Chaikin and Fanny Podolski. Throne was raised in The Bronx. He first appeared on stage at the age of ten in 1939 in the New York Parks Department production of Tom Sawyer as Huckleberry Finn.

He attended Brooklyn College, and served in the U.S. Army during the Korean War.

Two sons were born to him and his first wife, Judith Merians, in Hollywood, California: Zach Throne (a musician on the Corey Taylor album CMFT) was born in 1967 and Josh Throne in 1969.

Television career

Throne was a guest star on many television series of the 1960s and 1970s, including Mr. Novak (four episodes), The Defenders, Naked City, The Wild Wild West, Ben Casey, The Untouchables, GE True, Combat!, The Fugitive, Laredo (1966 as Finnegan in the episode "Finnegan"), The Man from U.N.C.L.E. ("The Four-Steps Affair" from 1965), Mannix (as Inspector Frank Kyler in the 1967 episode, "Run Sheep Run"), The High Chaparral, Hogan's Heroes, Babylon 5 ( "The Coming of Shadows" ) and Lost in Space.  He also played the character Sandifer in the 1964 Perry Mason episode The Case of the Simple Simon.

He co-starred, with Robert Wagner, in the TV series It Takes a Thief. Throne was a favorite actor of TV producer Irwin Allen; he appeared in numerous roles in Allen's series Voyage to the Bottom of the Sea, The Time Tunnel, Land of the Giants, and Lost in Space, often as several different characters in the same series. Throne played in two episodes of Mission: Impossible during seasons one and four as two different characters. Earlier in The Outer Limits TV series ("Cold Hands, Warm Heart", 1964) he appeared with William Shatner.

Roles in Star Trek
Throne provided the voice of the Keeper in the Star Trek'''s first pilot episode "The Cage" (1964). Not broadcast in its original form for many years, most of the episode was included within the two-part "The Menagerie" (1966). As Throne was cast in another role in "The Menagerie", Commodore José I. Méndez, the Keeper's voice was electronically altered in pitch.

On Star Trek: The Next Generation, Throne played Pardek, a Romulan senator, in the two-part episode "Unification". In 2004, he appeared in the second episode of the New Voyages, titled "In Harm's Way".

Roles in Batman
He played the villain False-Face in the ABC series Batman. The character, who used a variety of disguises to effect his nefarious schemes, wore a semitransparent mask when not in the middle of his crimes. The mask rendered Throne's face unrecognizable on screen. Playing off this effect, but against Throne's wishes, the show's producers wrote the onscreen credit as "? as False Face", denying Throne his screen credit. But at the end credits of "Holy Rat Race", Throne's full name was credited. Later, he appeared in animation as the voices of the Judge on The New Batman Adventures (1998) and Fingers the Gorilla on Batman Beyond (2000).

Film appearances
His film career was not as prolific as his television work, though he did have roles in films such as The Young Lovers (1964), Beau Geste (1966), Code Name: Heraclitus (1967), Assault on the Wayne (1971), The Greatest (1977), Stunts (1977) and Primary Motive (1992). He also had a small role in the 2002 film Catch Me if You Can.

Theater career
Throne lived in Southern California, and he did much local theater work there. He was a member of the Theater West company in Hollywood. He also won critical acclaim for several performances with the Fountain Theatre in Los Angeles. Much earlier in his career, he had appeared briefly on Broadway (as Mal Thorne) in Reginald Lawrence's Legend of Lizzie and other plays.

Advertising
Malachi Throne was a national television spokesman for Ziebart in several advertising campaigns throughout the 1970s. He also narrated the 1976 trailer for the film Star Wars (1977).

Death
Throne died of lung cancer at his home in Brentwood, California on March 13, 2013, at the age of 84.

Filmography

Discography
In 1980, Throne provided the voice-over narration for a vinyl record soundtrack version of the Star Wars sequel film, The Empire Strikes Back.  In 1999, he provided the narration for rock band Powerman 5000’s album Tonight the Stars Revolt!''

References

External links

 
 
 

 
 

1928 births
2013 deaths
American Ashkenazi Jews
American male child actors
American male stage actors
American male television actors
Male actors from New York City
Deaths from lung cancer in California
American male voice actors
Jewish American male actors
American people of Austrian-Jewish descent
American people of Hungarian-Jewish descent
Brooklyn College alumni
21st-century American Jews